Sheila Okai  (born 14 February 1979) is a Ghanaian women's international footballer who plays as a midfielder and forward. She is a member of the Ghana women's national football team. She was part of the team at the 1999 FIFA Women's World Cup and at the 2007 FIFA Women's World Cup. On club level she plays for Ghatel Ladies in Ghana.

References

1979 births
Living people
Ghanaian women's footballers
Ghana women's international footballers
Place of birth missing (living people)
2007 FIFA Women's World Cup players
Women's association football midfielders
Women's association football forwards
1999 FIFA Women's World Cup players